NGC 4605 is a dwarf barred spiral galaxy in the constellation Ursa Major, located at a distance of  from the Milky Way. Physically it is similar in size and in B-band absolute magnitude to the Large Magellanic Cloud. It is a member of the M81 Galaxy Group, along with Messier 81 and Messier 101.

References

External links

Unbarred spiral galaxies
Peculiar galaxies
Ursa Major (constellation)
4605
07831
042408